The 1924 United States presidential election in Rhode Island took place on November 4, 1924, as part of the 1924 United States presidential election which was held throughout all contemporary 48 states. Voters chose five representatives, or electors to the Electoral College, who voted for president and vice president. 

Rhode Island voted for the Republican nominee, incumbent President Calvin Coolidge of Massachusetts, over the Democratic nominee, Ambassador John W. Davis of West Virginia. Coolidge ran with former Budget Director Charles G. Dawes of Illinois, while Davis ran with Governor Charles W. Bryan of Nebraska. Also in the running that year was the Progressive Party nominee, Senator Robert M. La Follette of Wisconsin and his running mate Senator Burton K. Wheeler of Montana. La Follette’s support base was primarily among rural German and Scandinavian Americans, particurally German Catholics, and he possessed little appeal in the Northeast outside a few New York and Boston anti-Prohibition precincts despite the area's large Catholic population. This was especially true in Rhode Island where La Follette’s opposition to the League of Nations was severely unpopular, and consequently Rhode Island was La Follette’s sixth-weakest state and weakest outside the former Confederacy where the lower classes were almost entirely disfranchised.

Coolidge won Rhode Island by a margin of 23.17%. His victory was also enjoyed a unique personal popularity which helped him in the state and the rest of New England. He was the epitome of a traditional New England Yankee, having been born in the small-town of Plymouth Notch, Vermont, and establishing his political career nearby as Governor of Massachusetts. Thus Coolidge remained especially popular with voters across the New England region.

The 1920s were a fiercely Republican decade in American politics, and Rhode Island in that era was a fiercely Republican state in presidential elections. The economic boom and social good feelings of the Roaring Twenties under popular Republican leadership virtually guaranteed Calvin Coolidge an easy win in the state against the conservative Southern Democrat Davis. Although Davis’ reticence on the Ku Klux Klan was opposed by large Catholic populations in Rhode Island, his status as the solitary pro-League of Nations candidate helped him in the Ocean State with its large immigrant population. Consequently Davis gained almost 4% on Cox’s 1920 vote and in fact Rhode Island was his third strongest state in the North and West (behind New Mexico and Indiana), giving Davis a vote percentage 7.64% above his national figure.

In effect, Davis’ gain would begin Rhode Island's transition from a strongly Yankee Republican state into a Democratic-leaning state, made definitive via Catholic Al Smith’s win 4 years later. Rhode Island would not vote for another Republican presidential candidate until Dwight D. Eisenhower in 1952, and since 1924, Republicans have only carried the state four times. As of 2020, this was the last presidential election in which the Republican candidate won the state's capital and largest city, Providence.

Results

By county

Results by town

See also
 United States presidential elections in Rhode Island

References

Rhode Island
1924
1924 Rhode Island elections